HMS Grove (L77) was a  destroyer of the Royal Navy. She had been completed in early 1942 at the Swan Hunter yard at Wallsend-on-Tyne.

Service history

Initial success
This followed a 'Huff Duff' (High frequency Direction finding) interception.

Loss
The ship sank with the loss of 110 men. The destroyer  rescued 79 survivors.

References

 

Hunt-class destroyers of the Royal Navy
Ships built by Swan Hunter
Ships built on the River Tyne
1941 ships
World War II destroyers of the United Kingdom
Ships sunk by German submarines in World War II
World War II shipwrecks in the Mediterranean Sea
Maritime incidents in June 1942